Rasmus Schmidt Nicolaisen (born 16 March 1997) is a Danish professional footballer who plays as a centre-back for  club Toulouse.

Club career
On 23 September 2020, Nicolaisen joined EFL League One club Portsmouth on a season-long loan deal. He scored his first goal for Portsmouth in a 6–1 FA Cup win against King's Lynn Town on 28 November 2020.

In the 2021–22 season, Nicolaisen helped Toulouse achieve promotion to Ligue 1 by winning Ligue 2.

International career
Nicolaisen has represented Denmark up to under-19 level.

Honours
Midtjylland
 Danish Superliga: 2019–20
 Danish Cup: 2018–19

Portsmouth
 EFL Trophy runner-up: 2019–20

Toulouse
 Ligue 2: 2021–22

Individual
 UNFP Ligue 2 Team of the Year: 2021–22

References

External links
 
 

1997 births
Living people
People from Herning Municipality
Sportspeople from the Central Denmark Region
Danish men's footballers
Association football defenders
Denmark youth international footballers
Danish Superliga players
English Football League players
Ligue 1 players
Ligue 2 players
FC Midtjylland players
Portsmouth F.C. players
Toulouse FC players
Danish expatriate men's footballers
Danish expatriate sportspeople in England
Expatriate footballers in England
Danish expatriate sportspeople in France
Expatriate footballers in France